Arlo (pronounced AR-loh) is a traditionally male given name. Some sources state it to be of Old English origin, meaning "from the hill fort"; it was first used by Edmund Spenser, who "evidently invented" it, as the name of a hill where the gods debate in his poem The Faerie Queene (1590 and 1596).

A 2018 Yahoo! UK article indicated an increasing popularity of "Arlo" – alongside such names as "James", "Charlie", "Noah", and "Reggie"  as a girls' name in England and Wales.

People

Arts and sciences
 Arlo Bates (1850–1918), American author, educator and newspaperman
 Arlo Gilliam (born 1977), American singer-songwriter and record producer
 Arlo Guthrie (born 1947), American folk singer
 Arlo Haskell, historian, poet, literary organizer, and publisher
 Arlo Hemphill (born 1971), American explorer, ocean conservationist and film actor
 Arlo U. Landolt (1935–2022), American astronomer
 Arlo Parks (born 2000), British musician 
 Arlo West (born 1958), American singer/songwriter

Military
 Arlo L. Olson (1918–1943), American military officer and recipient of the Medal of Honor

Politics
 Arlo Hullinger (1921–2021), American politician
 Arlo Looking Cloud (born 1954), Native American activist
 Arlo Schmidt (1931-2022), American politician
 Arlo Smith, District Attorney of San Francisco, California, during 1980–1996

Sports
 Arlo Brunsberg (born 1940), former professional baseball player
 Arlo Bugeja (born 1986), Australian speedway rider
 Arlo Chavez (born 1966), Filipino boxer who has competed at the 1992 Summer Olympics
 Arlo Eisenberg (born 1973), American aggressive inline skater
 Arlo White (born 1973), English sports commentator

Fictional characters

Television
 Arlo Beauregard, in the 2021 Netflix animated series I Heart Arlo, voiced by Michael J. Woodard
 Arlo Davenport, on the British soap opera Hollyoaks
 Arlo Dean, on the British soap opera Family Affairs
 Arlo Givens, on the television series Justified, portrayed by Raymond J. Barry
 Arlo Glass, on the 8th season of the television series 24

Films
 Arlo Pear, in the 1988 comedy film Moving, portrayed by Richard Pryor
 Arlo, in the 2002 comedy film Orange County, played by Kyle Howard
 Arlo, a young green Apatosaurus and the main character in the 2015 Disney/Pixar animated film The Good Dinosaur
 Arlo Beauregard, the lead titular character in the 2021 Netflix film Arlo the Alligator Boy, voiced by Michael J. Woodard

Comics
 one of the titular characters of Arlo and Janis, an American comic strip

References 

English masculine given names